Good Sign is a song written by Lasse "Yogi" Anderson and Swedish singer Emilia Rydberg, and recorded by Emilia on her 1998 album Big Big World. The single was released on 7 December 1998 as the follow-up to her very successful debut-single "Big Big World". It peaked at number 16 in Sweden. Additionally it was a top 30 hit in Belgium, France and Switzerland and a top 40 hit in Austria. In the UK, "Good Sign" peaked at number 54.

Critical reception
AllMusic editor Roxanne Blanford described the song as a "uptempo celebration of life, delivered with sincerity and an engagingly happy sing-along chorus." The Daily Vault's Christopher Thelen wrote that Emilia's vocals on "Good Sign" are "powerful without being overbearing", adding that a "solid beat (even though a lot of it is synthesized), matched with some well-placed Vocoder lyrics is evidence enough that Emilia has a reasonable shot at stardom." Chuck Campbell from Knoxville News Sentinel said that the singer offers "an uplifting bit of reggae-tinged light R&B". Larry Printz from The Morning Call declared it as "Swedish pop in the ABBA/Ace of Base tradition."

Track listing
 CD single
"Good Sign" (album version)
"Good Sign" (R & B-remix)

 Maxi single (Universal 087 206-2)
"Good Sign" (K-Klass Radio Mix) - 3:43
"Good Sign" (Album Version) - 3:02
"Good Sign" (Pierre J's Good 12") - 5:33
"Good Sign" (K-Klass Bunker Dub) - 6:24

Charts

References

1998 singles
Emilia Rydberg songs
English-language Swedish songs
Songs written by Emilia Rydberg
Universal Music Group singles
1998 songs
Songs written by Lasse Anderson